Brown Township is one of the eighteen townships of Delaware County, Ohio, United States. As of the 2010 census the population was 1,416.

Geography
Located in the northern part of the county, it borders the following townships:
Oxford Township - north
Peru Township, Morrow County - northeast corner
Kingston Township - east
Berkshire Township - southeast corner
Berlin Township - south
Delaware Township - southwest
Troy Township - northwest

A small, uninhabited part of the city of Delaware, the county seat of Delaware County, is located in southwestern Brown Township, and the unincorporated community of Kilbourne lies in the township's east.

Name and history
Brown Township was created about 1826.

It is one of eight Brown Townships statewide.

Government
The township is governed by a three-member board of trustees, who are elected in November of odd-numbered years to a four-year term beginning on the following January 1. Two are elected in the year after the presidential election and one is elected in the year before it. There is also an elected township fiscal officer, who serves a four-year term beginning on April 1 of the year after the election, which is held in November of the year before the presidential election. Vacancies in the fiscal officership or on the board of trustees are filled by the remaining trustees.

Public services
Emergency medical services in Brown Township are provided by the Delaware County EMS.

References

External links
County website

Townships in Delaware County, Ohio
Townships in Ohio